Raphael Borges Rodrigues (born 11 September 2003), is an Australian professional soccer player who plays as a attacking midfielder for Melbourne City. He is the son of the Brazilian former professional footballer Cristiano dos Santos Rodrigues.

Career statistics

Club

References

External links

2003 births
Living people
Australian soccer players
Dutch footballers
Australian people of Brazilian descent
Dutch people of Brazilian descent
Dutch emigrants to Australia
Brazilian emigrants to Australia
Association football forwards
Melbourne City FC players
National Premier Leagues players
A-League Men players
Footballers from Maastricht
Australian people of Dutch descent